The Federação Amapaense de Futebol (English: Football Association of Amapá state) was founded on June 26, 1945, and it manages all the official football tournaments within the state of Amapá, which are the Campeonato Amapaense and the Campeonato Amapaense lower levels, and represents the clubs at the Brazilian Football Confederation (CBF).

References

Amapaense
Football in Amapá
Sports organizations established in 1945